
Year 655 (DCLV) was a common year starting on Thursday (link will display the full calendar) of the Julian calendar. The denomination 655 for this year has been used since the early medieval period, when the Anno Domini calendar era became the prevalent method in Europe for naming years.

Events 
 By place 
 Byzantine Empire 
 Battle of the Masts: Emperor Constans II personally commands the Byzantine fleet (500 ships), and sets off to challenge the Arab navy. He sails to the province of Lycia (now in Turkey) in the southern region of Asia Minor. The two forces meet off the coast of Mount Phoenix, near the harbour of Phoenix (modern Finike). The Arabs under Abdullah ibn Sa'ad are victorious in battle, although losses are heavy for both sides. Constans barely escapes to Constantinople.

 Britain 
 November 15 – Battle of the Winwaed: King Oswiu of Bernicia defeats his rival, King Penda of Mercia at Cock Beck, near what later will be Leeds (Yorkshire). Kings Cadafael Cadomedd of Gwynedd and Œthelwald of Deira, allies of Mercia, withdraw their forces before the battle begins. It marks the defeat of the last credible pagan force in England. It also sows the seeds which will lead to Anglo-Saxon acceptance of the Catholic Church (approximate date).
 Oswiu becomes overlord (bretwalda) over much of Great Britain. He establishes himself as king of Mercia, setting up his son-in-law, Penda's son Peada, as a subject king over Middle Anglia.

 Asia 
 Empress Kōgyoku re-ascends to the throne of Japan, beginning a new reign as Saimei-tennō.
 Arab armies conquer Khurasan (Iran), and the Silk Road along Transoxiana (Central Asia).
 King Vikramaditya I of Chalukya (India) re-unites the kingdom, after defeating his brothers.

 By topic 
 Religion 
 May 15 – Pope Martin I is banished to Chersonesos Taurica (Ukraine). He dies later in the Crimean Peninsula after a 6-year reign, leaving Eugene I as the uncontested pope (see 654).
 Peada founds Peterborough Cathedral (Province of Canterbury). It becomes one of the first centres of Christianity in England. Deusdedit is consecrated as archbishop of Canterbury.

Births 
 John VI, pope of Rome (d. 705)

Deaths 
 September 16 – Pope Martin I
 November 15 – Æthelhere, king of East Anglia
 November 15 – Penda, king of Mercia
 Cadafael Cadomedd, king of Gwynedd
 Didier of Cahors, Frankish bishop
 Foillan, Irish missionary (approximate date)
 Loingsech mac Colmáin, king of Connacht (Ireland)
 Theodore Rshtuni, Armenian general
 Wang, empress of the Tang dynasty
 Xiao, concubine of Gao Zong

References

Sources